Paul Grundy is an American physician known as the "godfather" of the Patient Centered Medical Home. 
He was named a member of the Institute of Medicine and recipient of the Barbara Starfield Primary Care Leadership Award and the 2012 National Committee for Quality Assurance(NCQA) Quality Award.

Grundy served as IBM's Global Director of Healthcare Transformation and Chief Medical Officer of IBM's Healthcare and Life Science Industry. He championed the medical home model with IBM colleagues Randy MacDonald, Dan Pelino, Sean Hogan and Nick Donofrio. Grundy developed strategies towards shifting healthcare delivery towards consumer-focused, primary-care based systems through the adoption of new philosophies, primary-care pilot programs, incentives systems, and the information technology. He is one of 38 IBMers and the only physician selected into the IBM Industry Academy.

Grundy is the founding president of the Patient Centered Primary Care Collaborative and is an adjunct professor at the University of Utah School of Medicine, in the Departments of Family Medicine and Preventive Medicine and the University of California San Francisco School of Medicine Department of Family and Community Medicine. He is a founding board member of the Get the Medications Right (GTMRx) Institute.

A social entrepreneur and speaker on global healthcare transformation, Grundy continues to champion the concept of the Patient Centered Medical Home. His work has been reported in Forbes, the Economist, and the Huffington Post. Grundy has been invited to TED conference, Smarter healthcare by smarter use of data, or NHS Confederation conference, Foundation for Healthcare Transformation.

Grundy is the subject of a book on healthcare entitled Trusted Healers: Dr. Paul Grundy and the Global Healthcare Crusade by Dan Pelino with Bud Ramey, which publishes in the fall of 2019. He is also a co-author of the book Lost and Found: A Consumer's Guide to Healthcare and The Familiar Physician by Dr. Peter B. Anderson, Bud Ramey and Tom Emswiller. He is the featured physician in the 2015 book The Familiar Physician by Dr. Peter Anderson with Bud Ramey (co-author) and Tom Emswiller.

Early life and education 

Paul Grundy spent his early life in West Africa, the son of Quaker missionaries. He attended medical school at the University of California San Francisco and earned his Master's Degree in Public Health at the University of California Berkeley. Grundy performed his residency training at Johns Hopkins in preventive medicine. He also completed a post doctoral fellowship at Johns Hopkins in occupational health in the international environment.

Career
From 1997 to 2000, he was the corporate occupational medical director for International SOS, providing and coordinating care and medical assistance for multinational corporations.

From 1994 to 1997, he was the medical director of Adventist Health Systems, Pennsylvania, and the medical director for the largest occupational medicine program in Berks County, Pennsylvania.

From 1979 to 1985 Grundy was a medical officer in the U.S. Air Force, where he taught at the School of Aerospace Medicine. He also served as a flight surgeon and Chief of Hospital Services in Korea.

From 1985 to 1994 he was a regional medical officer and counselor of embassy for medical affairs, U.S. Department of State. In this role, Grundy was responsible for leading the interactions between health and diplomacy, successfully organizing such activities as the Clinton/Yeltsin health initiative, a $157 million bilateral initiative in Russia. In his role with the Department of State, he was responsible for advising United States Ambassadors on health-care programs for diplomatic posts. Working closely with Nelson Mandela and Helene Gayle and State Department  Tex Harris, he set up the first U.S. policy and program addressing the HIV/AIDS epidemic in Africa. He worked to organize a Congressional fact-finding mission on the extent of the HIV/AIDS problem and drafted the first bill in congress dealing with the HIV/AIDS epidemic in Africa. Grundy finished his career in the Department of State as a Minister Counselor.

Grundy has served as a director of the Accreditation Council for Graduate Medical Education, the body responsible for accrediting graduate medical training programs, Member National Advisory Board of the National Center for Interprofessional Education and the Medical Education Futures Study. Grundy is the president of the Patient Centered Primary Care Collaborative, a coalition he led IBM in creating in early 2006. The coalition is dedicated to advancing a new primary-care model called the Patient Centered Medical Home as a means of fundamentally reforming healthcare delivery, which in turn is essential to maintaining US international competitiveness. It represents employers of some 50 million people across the United States as well as physician groups representing more than 330,000 medical doctors, leading consumer groups and the top seven US health-benefits companies. Grundy is regarded as the "godfather" of the patient-centered medical home concept because of his advocacy for its level of care and in creation of the Patient Centered Primary Care Collaborative.

Following his retirement in 2018 from IBM, Grundy accepted a role with Innovaccer, Inc of San Francisco.

He currently serves as president and on the board of directors for the Get the Medications Right (GTMRx) Institute and Foundation, a 501C3 non-profit dedicated to "ensure appropriate and personalized use of medication and gene therapies by advancing to a scientific, evidence-based and cost-effective decision-making process and a team-based, systematic approach to medication use."

Awards 
Grundy won the 2016 Barbara Starfield Primary Care Leadership Award for his life's work and dedication to the medical home model of care. He also won the Tim Ferriss Globetrotter Award 2010 from VT. He received the Defense Superior Service Award for outstanding service addressing HIV/AIDS and The Defense Meritorious Service Medal.

Grundy has been named an Ambassador for Healthcare Denmark in October 2014, a role in which he will share best practices from the Danish Healthcare system with doctors in the United States and in other parts of the world.

References 

Year of birth missing (living people)
Living people
American male writers
American physicians
Healthcare reform in the United States
IBM employees
Members of the National Academy of Medicine